Asian Studies Review is the journal associated with the Asian Studies Association of Australia. Published with Taylor & Francis, the journal is indexed with Scopus and the Bibliography of Asian Studies. ASAA ran a newsletter from 1975, switching to journal format in 1977, and called the ASAA Review. It acquired its present name in 1998. Editors have included Anthony Reid, Kam Louie, Jamie Mackie and Anthony Milner. The current editor is David Hundt (Deakin University). The best article of the year, as judged by a panel, is awarded the Wang Gungwu Prize.

According to the Journal Citation Reports, the journal has a 2021 impact factor of 1.278.

References

External links

Asian studies journals
Taylor & Francis academic journals
Academic journals associated with learned and professional societies of Australia
Publications established in 1977
Quarterly journals